The 2021–22 New Hampshire Wildcats Men's ice hockey season was the 96th season of play for the program and the 38th season in the Hockey East conference. The Wildcats represented the University of New Hampshire and were coached by Mike Souza, in his 4th season.

Season
For much of the season, New Hampshire's attempt at rebuilding the program were hampered by a lack of offense. The Wildcats finished almost as many games being shut out (four) as scoring more than 3 goals (five). A majority of the team's victories came as a result of strong defensive play.

UNH had their moments during the year, defeating several ranked teams, but they couldn't sustain their success for long. In the first half of the season the wildcats hovered around the .500 mark. After returning from the winter break, the team went on a 5-game winning streak to get their head above water. After that good stretch, however, the team stumbled down the stretch and lost eight of their final ten games. The offense was about as strong as it had been earlier in the year but the defense faltered, allowing almost 4 goals per game over that span.

The result of their poor finish was that New Hampshire slid down the Hockey East standings and had to open the conference playoffs on the road. They travelled south to play Boston College and vastly outshot the Eagles in the match, 47–27. Unfortunately, the defense was again an issue and the team needed a hat-trick from Tyler Ward just to get the game into overtime. It was not the Wildcat's night, unfortunately, and BC netted the game-winner. The loss capped off the season which, though it was an improvement over the previous campaign, was the 8th consecutive year that UNH did not possess a winning record.

Departures

Recruiting

Roster
As of August 19, 2021.

Standings

Schedule and results

|-
!colspan=12 style=";" | Regular Season

|-
!colspan=12 ! style=""; | 

|-
!colspan=12 style=";" |

Scoring statistics

Goaltending statistics

Rankings

Note: USCHO did not release a poll in week 24.

Players drafted into the NHL

2022 NHL Entry Draft

† incoming freshman

Awards and honors

References

2021–22
New Hampshire Wildcats
New Hampshire Wildcats
New Hampshire Wildcats
New Hampshire Wildcats